Fumiko Okuno ( Okuno Fumiko; born April 14, 1972 in Kyoto) is a former competitor in synchronised swimming from Japan. She competed in both the women's solo and women's duet events at the 1992 Summer Olympics, and won two bronze medals.

Personal life
Fumiko Okuno married track star Nobuharu Asahara in 2002. They have three children together.

References 

1972 births
Living people
Japanese synchronized swimmers
Olympic bronze medalists for Japan
Olympic synchronized swimmers of Japan
Synchronized swimmers at the 1992 Summer Olympics
Sportspeople from Kyoto
Olympic medalists in synchronized swimming
Asian Games medalists in artistic swimming
Artistic swimmers at the 1994 Asian Games
World Aquatics Championships medalists in synchronised swimming
Synchronized swimmers at the 1991 World Aquatics Championships
Synchronized swimmers at the 1994 World Aquatics Championships
Medalists at the 1992 Summer Olympics
Asian Games gold medalists for Japan
Medalists at the 1994 Asian Games
20th-century Japanese women